A zippula (plural: zippuli) is a fried dough made to a recipe from Calabria, Italy. Zippuli are made with flour, water, yeast, boiled potatoes, and a pinch of salt. There are many variations: often anchovies are added, but salt cod, stockfish, cheese, sun-dried tomatoes, olives, or 'nduja may also be added.

Though variations exist amongst some Calabrian families, the zippula dough is prepared with fresh parsley, formed into zippuli and deep-fried in a skillet.

They are traditional to the provinces of Reggio Calabria, of Catanzaro and of Vibo Valentia.

See also
Zeppole
List of fried dough foods
List of doughnut varieties

References

Italian pastries
Cuisine of Calabria
Christmas food
Italian doughnuts
Potato dishes
Anchovy dishes